The Minnesota–Wisconsin League, known as the "Minny" League, was a professional minor baseball league that existed from 1909 to 1912. It was a Class D league in 1909, 1910 and 1912 and a Class C league in 1911. As its name suggests, it featured teams based in the states of Minnesota and Wisconsin.

History
The inaugural 1909 Minnesota–Wisconsin League season featured the Duluth White Sox, Eau Claire Cream Puffs, La Crosse Outcasts, Winona Pirates, Wausau Lumberjacks and Superior Drillers as the six charter franchises in the league. The Duluth White Sox finished in first place, claiming the league championship.

In 1910, the Duluth White Sox, La Crosse Outcasts, Wausau Lumberjacks and Winona Pirates returned from 1909, while the Eau Claire Cream Puffs became the Eau Claire Commissioners and the Superior Drillers became the Superior Red Sox. The Red Wing Manufacturers and the Rochester Surgeons were newcomers to the league, which expanded to eight teams. The Eau Claire Commissioners finished in first place, winning the league championship.

In 1911, the league began play with the same teams as in 1910. During the season, the Red Wing and Wausau franchises both folded on June 26, 1911. The Superior Red Sox finished in first place, winning the league championship.

In 1912, the Minnesota–Wisconsin League began with four teams – the Eau Claire Commissioners, the La Crosse Outcasts, the Winona Pirates and the Rochester Bugs (formerly the Rochester Surgeons). Duluth and Superior left to form the Central International League. The Minnesota–Wisconsin League disbanded on July 1, 1912, with the Winona Pirates being the de facto league champion.

Notable players
Hall of Fame members Dave Bancroft, 1909 Duluth White Sox,1909 Superior Drillers, 1910–1911 Superior Red Sox and Burleigh Grimes, 1912 Eau Claire Commissioners, played in the league.

Cities represented 
Duluth, MN: Duluth White Sox 1909–1911 
Eau Claire, WI: Eau Claire Cream Puffs 1909; Eau Claire Commissioners 1910–1912 
LaCrosse, WI: LaCrosse Outcasts 1909–1912 
Red Wing, MN: Red Wing Manufacturers 1910–1911 
Rochester, MN: Rochester Roosters 1910; Rochester Bears 1911; Rochester Bugs 1912 
Superior, WI: Superior Drillers 1909; Superior Red Sox 1910–1911
Wausau, WI: Wausau Lumberjacks 1909–1911 
Winona, MN: Winona Pirates 1909–1912

Standings & statistics

1909 Minnesota-Wisconsin League

1910 Minnesota-Wisconsin League
schedule

1911 Minnesota-Wisconsin League
schedule
 Red Wing & Wausau disbanded June 26.

1912 Minnesota-Wisconsin League
1912 Minnesota-Wisconsin League schedule
 The league disbanded July 1.

References

"Rochester Surgeons Beat Outcasts Again." Duluth News Tribune (Duluth, Minn.) 26 May 1910. 11.

"Surgeons Lost Final Autopsy: Rochester Drops an Up and Down Contest -- Score is 8 to 4." Duluth News Tribune (Duluth, Minn.) 29 May 1911. 2.

Defunct minor baseball leagues in the United States
1909 establishments in Minnesota
1909 establishments in Wisconsin
1912 disestablishments in Minnesota
1912 disestablishments in Wisconsin
Sports leagues established in 1909
Sports leagues disestablished in 1912
Baseball leagues in Minnesota
Baseball leagues in Wisconsin